Ant chalk, also known as Chinese chalk or 'Miraculous Insecticide Chalk', is an insecticide in the form of normal looking chalk. It contains the pesticides deltamethrin and cypermethrin.

While the active ingredients are legal in the United States, the chalk is not legal there. Labeling often falsely claims the chalk is "harmless to human beings and animals" and "safe to use." Chalks have been found to cause serious health problems and deaths. Packaging generally does not list ingredients. Despite its illegal status, "Chinese Chalk" is illegally imported from China and sold in corner stores in the United States.

Notes

Insecticides